

Function
The WWE domains occur in two functional classes of proteins, namely those associated with ubiquitination and those associated with poly-ADP ribosylation (PARP). Hence, WWE domains hold an important function in signal transduction, protein degradation, DNA repair and apoptosis.

Protein Interactions
The WWE domain is named after three of its conserved residues, W and E residues (tryptophans and glutamate respectively), and is predicted to mediate specific protein-protein interactions in ubiquitin and ADP ribose conjugation systems (Poly ADP ribose polymerase). This domain is found as a tandem repeat at the N-terminal of Deltex, a cytosolic effector of Notch signalling thought to bind the N-terminal of the Notch receptor. It is also found as an interaction module in protein ubiquination and ADP ribosylation proteins.

Structure
Within each WWE module, the residues form two similar structures vital to its stability. The two WWE modules interact and form a large cleft suitable for binding of extended polypeptides. The two WWE modules adopt compact structures mostly composed of beta strands, with a single three turn alpha helix in both modules and an additional short helical segment in the second WWE module. The two WWE modules hold a two-fold rotation axis.

References

Protein families
Protein domains